Crow Canyon Archaeological Center  is a  research center and "living classroom" located in southwestern Colorado, US, which offers experiential education programs for students and adults.

Crow Canyon is a center for archaeological research, education, and preservation of the history of the Ancient Pueblo peoples, who lived on and in the cliff dwellings of Mesa Verde more than seven centuries ago. Established by private cultural initiatives that continue the work of American benefactors, the center provides hands-on programs for people to experience archaeological excavation of Native American sites.

Brief history 

Crow Canyon is the result of work in experiential and hands-on education started in 1967 by Edward F. Berger, a history teacher with the Cherry Creek Schools near Denver, Colorado. Berger brought students to SW Colorado  and involved them in building community and programs that increased motivation and accelerated learning.  Because of the rich prehistoric cultural base in the area, archaeology was added to the curricula and Berger, with the help of Dr. Art Rohn (then of Wichita State University) supported Rohn's graduate students to teach and supervise high school students doing original research excavating ancient pueblo sites.  The development of this arrangement with academic scholars and the involvement and teaching of high school age students is believed to be first of its kind.

In 1972, Berger began working through the University of Northern Colorado on a doctoral program designed to create and field test experiential, motivational, and accelerated learning programs. These programs were interdisciplinary, supplemental high school credit courses. In 1972, Berger wrote the non-profit corporation Crow Canyon operates under today. Then it was called I-S Education Programs. 
In 1974, Berger purchased 80 acres of land west of Cortez, Colorado on Crow Canyon and began designing a year-round campus. He earned his Ed.D. in 1975. His research into learning continued and from 1975 until 1986, Berger, now joined by his wife Joanne, pioneered new and effective learning and teaching techniques. The challenge was taking a student from zero knowledge about SW history and archaeology to working alongside of an academic scholar – and being effective – in two days. The accelerated learning techniques he developed made this possible.

The original campus facilities were basic, but "better than tents". Educational programs were expanded to age groups 10–80 years of age. Dr. Ron Gould was the first staff archaeologist and teacher. Significant involvement with the Ute Mountain Ute Tribe resulted in special Native American programs on campus and deep and lasting relationships with Ute Neighbors. Survey work in the areas west of the campus resulted in the identification and naming of sites (Smithsonian Numbers). Many bear the names of the schools across the US whose students identified them.

By the early 80s, Crow Canyon was well known for its educational programs and its archaeological research. The Bergers needed capital to improve the campus and to free them of 24/7/365 responsibility. They learned of the Foundation for Illinois Archaeology and its fledgling program at Kampsville, Illinois. A young and dynamic man, Clark Hinsdale, was building an educational component. Bergers contacted professor Struever at Northwestern University who headed the FIA. Struever was a successful fundraiser and promoter. By 1983, negations resulted in a merger of the two non-profit corporations note that Non-profit corporations are not bought and sold. FIA then changed its name to The Center for American Archaeology (at Northwestern University). CAA paid off I-SEP's debts and Bergers donated 70 acres of land. A new lodge designed to house 40 students was built. A lab building was provided. Additional research archaeologists were hired, and Bergers identified two major sites for research: Sand Canyon Pueblo, and the Duckfoot Site. Southwest archaeologists coordinated the research design and standards, academic supervision, and selection of staff archaeologists.

In the spring of 1986, knowing that the center was on firm ground, Jo and Ed Berger resigned their positions of executive director and associate director respectively. They were able to pick their successor, Ian Sandy Thompson. So much had been accomplished and the model that drives Crow Canyon today had been tested and functioning for almost 18 years.

Today 

Since its foundation, the mission of Crow Canyon has been to preserve and protect the rich heritage of the ancient Pueblo Indians (or Anasazi) of the American Southwest  and to educate the public of the need to preserve and protect archaeological resources. Archaeological research has been conducted in the Mesa Verde region with the goal of teaching archaeology through hands-on experience. Students and teachers alike are invited to participate in research in the archaeological camp.

Key initiatives include education, research, and cultural programs. Past President and CEO Deborah Gangloff defined Crow Canyon's programs as an opportunity: "to not only learn archaeology and do archaeology...but also to have some fun".

Awards and recognition

2010 Society for American Archaeology 7.5 Film Fest award for the film Visit With Respect
(collaborative project by Crow Canyon, the Anasazi Heritage Center, and the San Juan
Mountains Association)

2008 National Trust for Historic Preservation's National Preservation Honor Award

2008 Colorado Historical Society's Caroline Bancroft History Award for the film
Visit with Respect (awarded to the Anasazi Heritage Center for a collaborative
project with Crow Canyon and the San Juan Mountains Association)

2006 Colorado Historical Society's Caroline Bancroft History Award for project titled
"Making History: Engaging the Public in Reconstructing the Past"

2006 Colorado Preservation, Inc., State Honor Award for project titled "Ancient Images,
Pueblo Perspectives" (co-recipient with the Anasazi Heritage Center)

2003 Colorado Historical Society's Stephen H. Hart Award for Leadership in
Educational Programming in Colorado Archaeology

2003 Princeton Review: The Best 109 Internships

2002 Awesome Library Editor's Choice for Castle Rock Pueblo: A Trip Through Time

1999 Society for American Archaeology's Award for Excellence in Public Education

1992 President's Historic Preservation Award

1991 El Pomar Foundation's Henry McAllister Award for Excellence in Special Projects

Excavation sites 
There are several excavation sites at the Crow Canyon Archaeological Center.  They may be used as part of the Center's programs for further excavation and study.

See also

 Anasazi State Park Museum
 Ancestral Puebloans

Other neighboring Ancient Pueblo sites in Colorado:
 Anasazi Heritage Center
 Canyons of the Ancients National Monument
 Hovenweep National Monument
 Mesa Verde National Park
 Ute Mountain Tribal Park in Mesa Verde
 Yucca House National Monument administered by the Mesa Verde National Park

Other cultures in the Four Corners region:
 Ancient dwellings of Pueblo peoples
 List of prehistoric sites in Colorado
 Trail of the Ancients

References

Berger, Edward F. Crow Canyon: Pioneering Education And Archaeology on the Southwestern Colorado Frontier. Bloomington, Indiana: AuthorHouse, 1st edition: 1993. 2nd edition 2009.

External links
  Crow Canyon Archeological Center's - Official Site

Archaeological research institutes
Oasisamerica cultures
Ancient Puebloan archaeological sites in Colorado